Arthur Kilpin Bulley (10 January 1861 – 3 May 1942) was a British cotton merchant and creator of the Ness Botanic Gardens. He stood for Parliament as a women's suffrage candidate in 1910.

Personal life
Bulley was one of the 14 children of  Samuel Marshall and Mary (née Raffles).  He was born in New Brighton in 1861.

He married Harriet Agnes Whishaw in 1890. They were both committed teetotallers and politically active. They had two children together, Agnes Lois Bulley (1901–1995) and Alfred Wishaw Bulley (born 1905). Bulley's sisters included Amy Bulley and Ella Sophia Armitage, who unusually had a university education.

Career
After leaving school he joined his family's cotton trading business, often travelling overseas where he developed an interest in uncommon plants. Bulley purchased 60 acres of land near Ness in Cheshire in 1898, in which he built a house and a plant nursery, opening parts of the garden for free to villagers. Bulley commissioned plant collectors and botanists such as George Forrest, Augustine Henry, and Frank Kingdon-Ward to obtain plants from countries including South America, China, and Africa to place in his gardens. In 1903 Bulley opened a nursery, Bees Nursery (later Bees Ltd), at Ness where he sold plants grown from seeds originating in Europe and Asia.

In 1910 Bulley stood as the Women's Suffrage candidate in the 1910 election. He received the fewest votes but stated his aim was not to win but to ensure visibility of the suffrage cause. He subsequently stood unsuccessfully as a Labour candidate in November 1910. Bulley later campaigned in 1921 to open an Alpine garden on Snowdon, receiving criticism from those concerned about introducing foreign plants to the mountain, leading to his abandonment of the plan soon after.

The species Primula bulleyana  and the  orchid genus Bulleya Schlechter are named after Bulley.

References

1861 births
1942 deaths
Plant collectors
People from Cheshire